Robert Carman Coates,   (March 10, 1928 – January 12, 2016) was a Canadian politician and Cabinet minister.

Early life and education
Coates was born in Amherst, Nova Scotia, the son of a cattle buyer.

In 1951 Coates received a Bachelor of Arts in Political Science from Mount Allison University in nearby Sackville, New Brunswick. In 1954, Coates graduated from Dalhousie Law School in Halifax. Prior to his election, Coates was a lawyer and member of the Nova Scotia Barristers' Society.

Political career
Coates was first elected to the House of Commons of Canada in the 1957 election as the Progressive Conservative Member of Parliament (MP) for Cumberland, Nova Scotia. Coates was a backbencher during the John Diefenbaker and Joe Clark governments. He was appointed to the Cabinet of Brian Mulroney as Defence Minister following the Tory victory in the 1984 election.

Coates' main initiative was the re-introduction of separate uniforms for the naval, land and air branches of the military. Liberal Paul Hellyer had unified the Royal Canadian Navy, Canadian Army and Royal Canadian Air Force into an integrated Canadian Forces with a single uniform in 1967. Hellyer had scrapped the traditional British style uniforms and ranks of the Canadian Army, Royal Canadian Navy and Royal Canadian Air Force. The new uniforms resembled those of the US air force.

Coates resigned from the Cabinet on February 12, 1985, after it emerged that he visited several strip clubs during a trip to West Germany in November 1984. Coates did not run in the 1988 election.

Death
Coates died in Halifax on January 12, 2016, after a short illness, at the age of 87.

Personal life
In 1954, Coates married Mary Blanche Wade of Perth Junction, New Brunswick. The couple had two children, David Wade and Jodi.

Archives 
There is Robert C. Coates fonds at Library and Archives Canada.

Electoral record

References

External links
 

1928 births
2016 deaths
Canadian Anglicans
Lawyers in Nova Scotia
Members of the House of Commons of Canada from Nova Scotia
Members of the King's Privy Council for Canada
People from Amherst, Nova Scotia
Progressive Conservative Party of Canada MPs
Place of birth missing
Members of the 24th Canadian Ministry
Defence ministers of Canada